Billy the Kid is an American Western period drama television series created by Michael Hirst. Set in the 19th century in the American Old West, it stars Tom Blyth as outlaw and gunfighter Billy the Kid. The series premiered on Epix on April 24, 2022. In January 2023, the series was renewed for a second season.

Premise
An epic romantic adventure based on the life of Billy the Kid, from his humble Irish roots and his early days as a cowboy and gunslinger in the American frontier, to his pivotal role in the Lincoln County War and beyond.

Cast and characters
 Tom Blyth as Billy the Kid
 Daniel Webber as Jesse Evans
 Eileen O'Higgins as Kathleen McCarty
 Sean Owen Roberts as Bob Olinger
 Dakota Daulby as John Beckwith
 Ryan Kennedy as Ash Upson
 Ian Tracey as Frank Baker
 Jonah Collier as young Billy the Kid
 Vincent Walsh as Lawrence Murphy
 Jamie Beamish as Henry Antrim
 Guillermo Alonso as Melquiades Segura
 Shaun Benson as Riley
 Christie Burke as Barbara Jones
 Chad Rook as James Dolan
 Brendan Fletcher as George Coe
 Joey Batey as Patrick McCarty
 Alex Roe as Pat Garrett
 Horatio James as Charlie Bowdre

Episodes

Production

Development
On May 4, 2021, it was announced that Epix greenlit the series for an eight-episode first season, which will be written and executive produced by Michael Hirst. It was also announced that Otto Bathurst will direct the first two episodes. Production companies involved with the series include Epix, MGM International TV Productions and Nordic Entertainment Group. On January 10, 2023, the series was renewed for a second season.

Casting
On May 13, 2021, it was announced that Tom Blyth had been cast in the series' lead role. On August 27, 2021, it was announced that Daniel Webber had been cast as Jesse Evans.

Filming
Principal photography for the series took place in and around Calgary, Alberta, Canada.

Release
The series held their world premiere in March 2022 at the Series Mania TV festival in Lille, France. The series premiered in the United States on Epix on April 24, 2022. In Australia, it was distributed by Stan. In Canada, it is available to stream on Paramount+.

Reception
Review aggregator Rotten Tomatoes reported an approval rating of 43% with an average rating of 5.90 out of 10.

References

External links
 
 

2022 American television series debuts
2020s American drama television series
2020s Western (genre) television series
English-language television shows
MGM+ original programming
Television series by MGM Television
Television series by Amblin Entertainment
Television series set in the 19th century
Television shows filmed in Calgary
Cultural depictions of Billy the Kid